Danny Facey is a Grenadian international footballer who plays for English club Albion Sports, as a striker.

Career
Facey scored nine goals in five games for Towngate, and moved from Bradford Park Avenue to Ossett Town in January 2011.

In July 2015 he joined Brighouse Town, returning to Albion Sports in July 2016.

Facey made his international debut for Grenada in 2011.

Personal life
He is the younger brother of Delroy Facey and cousin to Anthony Griffith.

References

1980s births
Living people
English footballers
Grenadian footballers
Grenada international footballers
Bradford (Park Avenue) A.F.C. players
Ossett Town F.C. players
Brighouse Town F.C. players
Albion Sports A.F.C. players
Association football forwards